Osorno Volcano is a  conical stratovolcano lying between Osorno Province and Llanquihue Province, in the Los Lagos Region of southern Chile. It stands on the southeastern shore of Llanquihue Lake, and also towers over Todos los Santos Lake. Osorno is considered a symbol of the local landscape and, as such, tends to be the referential element of the area in regards to tourism. By some definitions it marks the northern boundary of Chilean Patagonia.

Etymology 
The volcano's current name comes from the nearby city of Osorno, from which it was visible to Spanish settlers. Native populations gave it different names, such as Purailla, Purarhue, Prarauque, Peripillan, Choshueco, Hueñauca and Guanauca. The latter two were the most commonly used names in the mid-18th century.

Overview 
The volcano has a height of 2,652 meters (8,701 feet) and an imposing conical shape which looms over Lago Llanquihue. It is situated across the lake from the cities of Frutillar, Puerto Varas, and Llanquehue. It dominates the region's landscape, and its height means that it can be seen from the entire province of Osorno, even in some places on the island of Chiloé. Volcán Osorno is located almost 45 kilometers (28 miles) northeast of Puerto Varas. Though in geological terms it is still considered an active volcano, there has been no volcanic activity in over one hundred years, having last erupted in 1869. In recent years the volcano has become a popular tourist attraction. Skiing and hiking have become common recreational activities on the mountain.

The volcano is accessible from the towns of Puerto Klocker, Ensenada, and Petrohué, and at its base is the town of Las Cascadas.

Volcanic activity 
Volcán Osorno is one of the most active volcanoes of the southern Chilean Andes, with eleven eruptions recorded between 1575 and 1869. It sits on top of a 250,000-year-old eroded stratovolcano, La Picada, with a 6-km-wide caldera.

On January 19, 1835, during the second voyage of the Beagle, Charles Darwin was near Ancud and witnessed an eruption of the volcano, which he recorded in his journal and which made him suspect the existence of a relationship between the simultaneous activity of geographically distant volcanoes. However, the data on which this idea was based were, at least in part, wrong, since they reported an eruption of Aconcagua, which is very unlikely given that even in Darwin's time Aconcagua was already a long-extinct paleovolcano.

Appearance 
The basalt and andesite lava flows generated during these eruptions reached both Lago Llanquihue and Lago Todos Los Santos. The upper slopes of the volcano are almost entirely covered in glaciers despite its very modest altitude and latitude, sustained by the substantial annual snowfall in the very moist maritime climate of the region. Osorno has also historically produced pyroclastic flow, since it is a composite volcano. The volcano has been noted for its similar appearance to Mount Fuji in Japan.

Image gallery

See also
 List of volcanoes in Chile

References

Further reading 
 
  (in Spanish; also includes volcanoes of Argentina, Bolivia, and Peru)

Stratovolcanoes of Chile
Mountains of Chile
Active volcanoes
Volcanoes of Los Lagos Region
Mountains of Los Lagos Region
South Volcanic Zone
Holocene stratovolcanoes